Periphrage is a monotypic moth genus of the family Erebidae. Its only species, Periphrage barbatula, is known from Brazil. Both the genus and species were first described by Gottlieb August Wilhelm Herrich-Schäffer in 1856.

References

Herminiinae
Monotypic moth genera